General elections are scheduled to be held in Liberia in 2023 to elect the President, House of Representatives and half the Senate. Incumbent George Weah is eligible for a second term.

Electoral system
The President is elected using the two-round system, whilst the 73 members of the House of Representatives are elected by first-past-the-post voting in single-member constituencies.

Candidates
Dr. Clarence K. Moniba, the leader of the Liberian National Union (LINU), announced Thursday, January 19, 2023 at 5 AM his intention to run for the presidency.

In January 2022, Nathaniel Barnes, a former Liberian ambassador to the United States (2008–2010) announced his intention to run for the presidency as an independent candidate.

References

Liberia
Elections in Liberia